Shree 420 (also spelled as Shri 420) is a 1955 Indian Hindi comedy-drama film directed and produced by Raj Kapoor from a story written by Khwaja Ahmad Abbas whose use of Shree with the negative connotations of 420 caused controversy. The film stars Nargis, Nadira, and Kapoor. The number 420 refers to Section 420 of the Indian Penal Code, which prescribes the punishment for the offence of fraud; hence, "Mr. 420" is a derogatory term for a fraud. The film centers on Raj Kapoor, a poor but educated orphan who comes to Bombay with dreams of success. Kapoor's character is influenced by Charlie Chaplin's "little tramp", much like Kapoor's character in his 1951 Awaara. The music was composed by the team of Shankar Jaikishan, and the lyrics were penned by Shailendra and Hasrat Jaipuri.

Shree 420 was the highest-grossing Indian film of 1955, the highest grossing Indian film of all time at the time of its release and the song "Mera Joota Hai Japani" ("My Shoes are Japanese"), sung by Mukesh, became popular and a patriotic symbol of the newly independent India.

Plot

A country boy, Raj (Raj Kapoor), from Allahabad, travels to the big city, Bombay, by walking, to earn a living. He falls in love with the poor but virtuous Vidya (Nargis), but is soon seduced by the riches of a freewheeling and unethical lifestyle presented to him by an unscrupulous and dishonest businessman, Seth Sonachand Dharmanand (Nemo) and the sultry temptress Maya (Nadira). He eventually becomes a confidence trickster, or "420," who even cheats in card gambling. Vidya tries hard to make Raj a good man, but fails.

Meanwhile, Sonachand comes up with a Ponzi scheme to exploit poor people, whereby he promises permanent homes to them at just Rs. 100. The scheme pays off, as people start hoarding money for a home, even at the cost of other important things. Vidya's contempt for Raj increases even more. Raj becomes wealthy but soon realizes that he paid a very high price for it. When Raj discovers that Sonachand has no plans to fulfill his promises, he decides to make wrongs right.

Raj takes all the bond papers of the people's homes and tries to flee Sonachand's home, only to be caught by Sonachand and his cronies. In a scuffle that occurs, Sonachand shoots Raj and he falls unconscious. When people hear the shooting, they come and see Raj nearly dead. Sonachand tells police that Raj was trying to flee after stealing money from his safe, hence Sonachand shot him.

Upon this, the "dead" Raj springs back to life, and using pure logic, proves Sonachand's guilt. Sonachand and his partners are arrested, while Vidya happily forgives Raj. The film ends with Raj saying "Yeh 420 Nahin, Shree 420 Hain" ("These are not simply con men, they are respectable con men").

Cast
Cast in order of the opening credits of the film

 Nargis as Vidya
 Nadira as Maya
 Raj Kapoor as Ranbir Raj / Rajkumar Saxena
 Nemo as Seth Sonachand Dharmanand
 Lalita Pawar as Ganga Mai
 M. Kumar as Beggar
 Indira Billi as Seth Sonachand Dharmanand Daughter 
 Hari Shivdasani as Philachand
 Nana Palsikar
 Bhudo Advani as Dharmanand's valet
 Pessi Patel as Pawn Shop Owner
 Ramesh Sinha as Street Dweller 
 Rashid Khan as Raddiwala
 Sheila Vaaz as dancer 
 S. P. Berry 
 Kathana as Customer
 Satyanarayan
 Shailendra lyricist
 Rajoo as young boy
 Mansaram 
 Iftikhar as Police Inspector
 Uma Devi as Maya's Neighbor
 Anwari
 Mirajkar as Inspector 
 Bhagwandas
 Late Bishamber

Allusions
The title refers to section 420 of the Indian penal code, where crimes of theft and deception are punished, which relates to the troubles of the main character.

In Sanskrit, the name of the main character, "Vidya", means knowledge, while "Maya" means Illusion.

The title of one of the songs in the movie is "Ramaiya Vastavaiya" is in Telugu, which means "Lord Ram, you will come". The title alone is derived from an old Telugu folk song. Apart from that, the rest of the song's lyrics (and the film) are in Hindi. The story goes, the Telugu dubbed version of the film Aah, 1953 was so well received that Raj Kapoor was elated and showed his gratitude for Telugu audiences by having a song in the film beginning with these lines.

At the beginning of the movie, the main protagonist explains to a policeman that one needs to stand on one's head to make sense of this world. He mentions that this is the reason why even great leaders stand on their heads. This is an allusion to several political leaders of that time who enjoyed practicing the Shirshasana, a yoga asana where one stands on his head. In his autobiography, Nehru described that the shirshasana was his favorite pose, and how he often did the shirshasana in jail, too.

Production

Raj Kapoor's real life children Randhir, Ritu and Rishi were featured in the song "Pyar Hua Iqrar Hua", Rishi revealed that Nargis bribed him with chocolate and recalled it in a 2017 interview.

Reception
The song "Mera Joota Hai Japani", in which the singer asserts his pride in being an Indian, despite his clothes being from other countries, became, and remains, a patriotic favourite among many Indians. It is often referenced, including in an acceptance speech at the Frankfurt Book Fair in 2006 by Bengali author Mahasweta Devi.

The film proved to be popular in other countries, including the Soviet Union, Romania, and Israel. In Russia, it was said that Raj Kapoor was as popular as Jawaharlal Nehru, due to the success of Awaara and Shree 420. In Israel, the song "Ichak Dana Beechak Dana" (transliterated as "Ichikidana") became popular and was re-recorded by local singer Naim Rajuan.

Box office
This record was beaten two years later by Mother India in 1957.

It was released in the Soviet Union in 1956, coming second on the Soviet box office charts that year. Despite being imported at an unusually high price, it was the most successful foreign film of the year at the Soviet box office, drawing an audience of 35 million viewers.

Soundtrack

Awards
 1956: Filmfare Awards
 Best Cinematographer: Radhu Karmakar
 Best Editing: G.G. Mayekar
 National Film Awards
 1956: Certificate of Merit for the Second Best Feature Film in Hindi

See also
Raju Ban Gaya Gentleman

Notes

References

Further reading

External links
 
 Full movie on YouTube, also 
 Rediff.com - Classics Revisited: Shree 420
 Shree 420: film analysis at Let's talk about Bollywood

1955 films
1950s Hindi-language films
Films directed by Raj Kapoor
Films about orphans
Indian epic films
Films scored by Shankar–Jaikishan
R. K. Films films
Films with screenplays by Khwaja Ahmad Abbas
Indian Penal Code
Indian comedy-drama films
1955 comedy-drama films
Indian black-and-white films